"Radiation Vibe" is the debut single by Fountains of Wayne, from their eponymous debut album. It was released in 1996 on Atlantic Records.

Single releases
"Radiation Vibe" was released as a vinyl single with "Karpet King" as the b-side. There was also a  CD single which featured two other tracks, "Janice's Party" and "Imperia". All of these except "Radiation Vibe" were unavailable on any Fountains of Wayne album until the release of Out-of-State Plates in 2005. In the 2021 edition of Rolling Stone Magazine's "500 Greatest Songs" Radiation Vibe was placed at the 380 spot.

Track listing (CD single)
All tracks composed by Chris Collingwood and Adam Schlesinger:
"Radiation Vibe" – 3:40
"Karpet King" – 4:04
"Janice's Party" – 2:46
"Imperia" – 1:57

Charts
The single charted in the UK at No. 32 on March 22, 1997. It also reached No. 14 on the US Billboard Alternative Songs chart in January 1997.  In Australia, the single peaked at No. 95 in March 1997.

Weekly charts

Credits
Chris Collingwood – vocals, guitar, keyboards
Adam Schlesinger – vocals, guitar, keyboards, drums
Danny Weinkauf – bass guitar
Engineered by Gary Maurer
Mixed by Chris Shaw, Eric Tew
Mastered by Greg Calbi
Recorded in January and April 1996 at The Place, New York City
Mixed at Greene Street Recording, New York City
Mastered at Masterdisk, New York City

References

Fountains of Wayne songs
1996 debut singles
Songs written by Adam Schlesinger
1996 songs
Songs written by Chris Collingwood
Atlantic Records singles